Fernando Paulo "Nando" Matola (9 August 1982 – 2 September 2007) was a Mozambican footballer who played as a defender. He represented two clubs in a nine-year career and earned 15 caps for his country.

Career
Matola played for Costa do Sol in his homeland and Black Leopards in South Africa, both of which he captained.

Death
Matola was driving from Johannesburg to Maputo for an African Nations Cup qualifier against Tanzania when his car veered off the road and went up in flames. He, his wife and their children were burnt beyond recognition and the bodies were discovered four days later in South Africa's mountainous Limpopo province.

References

External links
 

1982 births
2007 deaths
Mozambican footballers
Mozambique international footballers
Association football defenders
Road incident deaths in South Africa
CD Costa do Sol players
Black Leopards F.C. players
Moçambola players
South African Premier Division players
Mozambican expatriate footballers
Mozambican expatriate sportspeople in South Africa
Expatriate soccer players in South Africa